Hinterwaldberg is a dispersed settlement in the Oberpinzgau, the upper Salzach valley  and the district of Zell am See/Pinzgau, and is a village and Katastralgemeinde in the municipality of Wald im Pinzgau, on the southern edge of the Kitzbühel Alps in Austria.

Geography 

The individual homesteads of Maut, Oberrankental, Reitlbauer, Seiten and Unterrankental, several farmsteads and the Ronachwirt inn. The Almdorf Königsleiten and its refuge hut, the Edelweißhaus at Gerlos, that belong to the Zillertal Arena ski area, were independent parishes several years ago, but now belong to the Katastralgemeinde.

In addition, Hinterwaldberg includes the following valleys, mountains and alms, that stretch north into the Kitzbühel Alps:
 on the southern slopes of the Gernkogel: Reitlasten, Bacherasten (Bacher Asten), Wiesachalm and Besensleinalm
 in the Nadernachbach valley: Bergeralm and Berger Hochalm towards Gernkogel, Bacheralm and Bacher Hochalm towards Baumgartgeier, Hieburgalm and Hiburg-Hochalm, Watsch-Niedernachalm and Watsch-Niedernach-Hochalm
 on the southern slopes of the Baumgartgeier/Ronachgeier: Putzalm, Prielalm (Prielhochalm ruins), Müller Mitterberg, Baxreinalm and Baxrain-Mitterberg (alsoPaxrain)
 in the high Salzach valley: Leienalm, Bucheckalm and  Brucheck Mittelleger (Brucheck-Hochalm ruins) to Königsleiten/Müllachgeier, Mülleralm, Müller Hochalm, Mottland Grundalm, Salzachalm, Müllach-Grundalm and Müllach-Hochalm towards Salzachgeier and Salzachjoch saddle.

The Katastralgemeinde'''s territory includes the two high valleys of Salzachursprung and Nadernachbach, and the area between the Ochsenkopf in the west, the Schwebenkopf and Kröndlhorn in the north and the Gernkogel to the east, up to the state border with Tyrol.

 History 
Hinterwaldberg lies on the old mule track (Saumpfad) from Mittersill as a trading hub on the route over the Gerlos Pass (Pinzgauer Höhe) to Zell am Ziller. It was upgraded into a cart track in 1631. In 1962 the new Gerlos Alpine Road (Gerlos Alpenstraße) via Krimml (today part of the B 165 Mittersill – Hainzenberg) was opened, that had been planned by graduate engineer Franz Wallack, the builder of the Großglockner High Alpine Road (Großglockner Hochalpenstraße). Consequently the Old Gerlos Road (Alte Gerlosstraße, today the L 133) lost its importance.

 Tourism and places of interest 
The Arno Trail (Arnoweg) runs through the village, having crossed the Salzach near Orgler after coming from Schloßberg. It then continues as a climbing path to the Pinzgauer Spaziergang'' above Lahn.

References 

 Sources

Wald im Pinzgau
Zell am See District
Kitzbühel Alps